Minnaminungu is a 2017 Indian Malayalam-language film directed by Anil Thomas and written by Manoj Ramsingh.

The film features Surabhi Lakshmi as a struggling middle-aged mother, her character has no name in the film. The film's soundtrack was composed by Ouseppachan. The film was produced on a small budget. It was released in India on 21 July 2017. Lakshmi received critical praise for her performance in the film. At the 47th Kerala State Film Awards, she received a Special Mention and at the 64th National Film Awards, she won the Best Actress.

Cast
 Surabhi Lakshmi as Mother
 Prem Prakash as MN
 Rebecca Santhosh as Charu
 Balu Narayan as Gopalan
 Krishnan Balakrishnan as Prabhu
 Archana Padmini as Vineetha
 Suresh Prem as Sudhi
 Radhakrishnan as Benchamin
 Arun Nair as Akbar Bai

References

External links
 

2010s Malayalam-language films
Films featuring a Best Actress National Award-winning performance
Films scored by Ouseppachan
Films shot in Thiruvananthapuram